Young Shire was a local government area in the South West Slopes region of New South Wales, Australia. The Shire was located adjacent to the Olympic Highway.

Young Shire was created on 1 July 1980 from the amalgamation of the Municipality of Young with the surrounding Burrangong Shire.

The Shire included the town of Young and the small towns of Maimuru, Milvale, Thuddungra, Bribbaree, Monteagle, Wirrimah, Bendick Murrell, Koorawatha and Murringo.

In 2016, Young Shire was amalgamated into Hilltops Council. The last Mayor of Young Shire Council was Cr. Brian Ingram, an independent politician.

Council

Composition and election method
At the time of dissolution, Young Shire Council was composed of nine Councillors elected proportionally as one entire ward. All Councillors were elected for a fixed four-year term of office. The Mayor was elected by the Councillors at the first meeting of the Council. The last election was held on 8 September 2012, and the makeup of the Council was as follows:

The final Council, elected in 2012, in order of election, was:

Amalgamation 
A 2015 review of local government boundaries recommended that Boorowa Council merge with adjoining councils. The NSW Government considered two proposals. Following the lodging of an alternate proposal by Harden Shire on 28 February 2016 to amalgamate the Cootamundra, Gundagai and Harden shires, the NSW Minister for Local Government proposed a merger between the Boorowa and Young shires.

Young Shire was abolished on 12 May 2016 and along with Boorowa Council and Harden Shire, the area was included in a new Hilltops Council local government area.

References

External links

 Young Shire Council
 Young Visitor Information (official)
 Young Shire Council business site

Former local government areas of New South Wales
2016 disestablishments in Australia
1980 establishments in Australia